Stanley's Dinosaur Round-Up is a 2005 American animated Western television film based on the Playhouse Disney television series Stanley. It was directed by Jeff Buckland and produced by Cartoon Pizza. The film is notable for being the final film role of actor John Ritter, the voice of Great Uncle Stew, who died in September 2003 and was also dedicated to his memory.

Plot

Stanley goes with his family and friends to his great uncle's dude ranch. The local land baron is trying to buy the ranch and make it a parking lot for his nearby amusement park. The only way Uncle Stew thinks he can get any money to save his ranch is to find other dinosaur bones to attract customers. Stanley and his friends help in the search.

Voice cast
Jessica D. Stone as Stanley
Charles Shaughnessy as Dennis
Khylan Jones as Mimi and Marci
David Landsberg as Mark Griff
Ari Meyers as Joyce Griff
Rene Mujica as Harry
Shawn Pyfrom as Lionel
Philece Sampler as Lester
Hynden Walch as Elsie
Hillary B. Smith as Paleontologist
John Ritter as Great Uncle Stew
Randy Quaid as Rockin' Rory
Riders in the Sky as themselves

References

External links

 

Disney direct-to-video animated films
2000s American animated films
2005 television films
2005 animated films
2005 films
2000s adventure films
2005 Western (genre) films
American Western (genre) films
American children's animated comedy films
American children's animated adventure films
Animated films based on animated series
Animated films about fish
Animated films about cats
Animated films about dogs
Animated films about dinosaurs
Animated films about children
Films with screenplays by Sherri Stoner
Western (genre) animated films
2000s English-language films